Ginger Baker's Air Force 2 was the second and final album by Ginger Baker's Air Force, released in 1970. In Germany, Australia and New Zealand it was released with a different track listing, including previously unreleased songs.

This album was recorded in a studio, unlike the previous one, featuring a different lineup of the band, with Denny Laine, Harold McNair, Aliki Ashman, and Ric Grech as "Additional personnel". Graham Bond took lead vocal duties along with Ginger Baker, Diane Stewart and Catherine James.

The album cover was designed left-handed; i.e. with the front cover printed on what traditionally would be considered the back and vice versa.

Track listing

Personnel
Ginger Baker – drums, timpani, tubular bells, African drums, vocals
Kenny Craddock – guitars, Hammond organ, piano, vocals
Colin Gibson – bass guitar
Graham Bond – alto saxophone, Hammond organ, piano, vocals
Steve Gregory – tenor saxophone, flutes
Bud Beadle – baritone, alto & tenor saxophones
Diane Stewart – vocals
Catherine James – vocals
Neemoi "Speedy" Acquaye – drums, percussion, African drums
Additional personnel
Denny Laine – guitars, piano, vocals
Rick Grech – bass guitar
Harold McNair – tenor & alto saxophones, flutes
Aliki Ashman – vocals
Rocky Dzidzornu – percussion, conga

References

1970 albums
Ginger Baker's Air Force albums
Polydor Records albums
Atco Records albums
Albums produced by Ginger Baker
Albums produced by Ric Grech
Albums produced by Danny Laine
Albums produced by Graham Bond
Albums recorded at Trident Studios
Albums recorded at Olympic Sound Studios